The Buttress Nunataks are a group of prominent coastal nunataks, the highest at , lying inland from George VI Sound and  west-northwest of the Seward Mountains, on the west coast of Palmer Land. They were first seen from a distance and roughly surveyed in 1936 by the British Graham Land Expedition under John Riddoch Rymill. They were visited and resurveyed in 1949 by the Falkland Islands Dependencies Survey, who gave this descriptive name.

References

 

Nunataks of Palmer Land